is one of the 100 Famous Japanese Mountains, reaching the height of . It is situated in Japan's Hida Mountains in Nagano Prefecture and in Chūbu-Sangaku National Park. The shape of the mountain looks like the triangle. It can be seen from Azumi Basin.

Outline 
This mountain is formed with Granite. Before 1959 nine kinds of butterfly on high mountains can be seen around the mountain. Colias erate and others can be seen now. The shape of the remaining snow of this mountain had decided the time when it farmed. The shape was called .

History 
 Summer 1894: Englishman Walter Weston became the first man to climb on the top.
 Summer 1906: Usui Kojima became the first Japanese man to climb on the top.
 1922: Kyūya Fukada stayed at the Jōnen Hut, and climbed this mountain.
 June 1931: The double accident of the climbing mountain party and the rescue team occurred.
 December 4, 1934: This area was  specified to the Chūbu-Sangaku National Park.
 1993: Postage stamp of Jōnen Kasa with Matsumoto Castle was put on the market by the Ministry of Posts and Telecommunications (Japan).
 May 28, 2007: NHK broadcasts the television program concerning Mount Jōnen in the series  programs of excellent mountain in Japan.
 September 10, 2010: NHK broadcasts the television program concerning Mount Jōnen and the high mountain butterfly.

Mountaineering

Main ascent routes 
There are three climbing routes to the top of the mountain. 
 
Ichino River route
Hie-Daira -  - Munatuki-hachō - Jōnen Hut(Jōnen-Nokkoshi) - Mount Jōnen
 route
Mitsumata(三股) - Hon river - Mount Mae-Jōnen - Mount Jōnen
Traverses Route of Jōnen Mountains (from north and south)
There are several stating points to climb.(Kamikōchi, Tokusawa, Yokoo, Mitsumata, from Mount Otensuo, and others)

Mountain hut 
Thera are several Mountain hut around Mount Jōnen. There is the Campsite on each hut.
It is one of the oldest hut in Japan.
 Mount Chō Hut (蝶ヶ岳ヒュッテ) - Near the top of Mount Chō.
 Yokoo Mountain Cottage (横尾山荘) - In Yokoo most in the north of Kamikochi.
 Daiten Cottage (大天荘) - Near the top of Mount Otensyo.

Geography

Nearby Mountains 
It is on the sub ridge line of Jōnen Mountains in the southeast part of the Hida Mountains. There is a small peak  of Mount Mae-Jōnen in the southeast by east.

Source river 
Each source river joins the main stream of Shinano River, then flows to the Sea of Japan. 
 Ichinomata Valley (Tributary of Azusa River)
 Jōnen River, Ichino River and Nino river (tributary of Sai (Nagano) River)

Gallery

See also 
 Chūbu-Sangaku National Park
 Hida Mountains
 List of mountains in Japan
 100 Famous Japanese Mountains

References

External links 
 

Hida Mountains
Mount Jonen
Mountains of Nagano Prefecture
Mount Jonen